Orsat "Medo" Pucić, (12 March 1821 – 30 June 1882) was a Ragusan writer and an important member of the  Catholic Serb movement.

Biography
He was descended from the House of Pucić, an old noble family of Republic of Ragusa. His brother was Niko Pucić. He attended the lyceum in Venice, where in 1841 he became acquainted with Ján Kollár. Pucić was impressed with his pan-Slavist ideas, and went on to join the Illyrian movement. Pucić's was a member of Serb Catholic movement.

He studied between 1841 and 1843 in the University of Padua, and then from 1843 to 1845 he studied law in Vienna and was a Knight Hospitaller of the Sovereign Order of Saint John. 
In 1841, Medo Pucić, a writer from an old Catholic noble family, became acquainted with pan-Slavists Ján Kollár and Pavel Jozef Šafárik, and started to espouse a Serb national sentiment. Pucić lived in the cities of Lucca and Parma between 1846 and 1849, and after that usually in Dubrovnik. Pucić was in active contact with cultural and political circles of Central Croatia, the rest of the Austrian Empire, and different countries of Europe. In March 1848 Pucić threw his lot with Adam Mickiewicz who was in Rome at the time trying to convince Pope Pius IX to endorse a Polish national revolution against the Habsburgs. In 1858 Medo Pucić published the first volume Serbian Documents (Spomenici Srpski) in Belgrade which consisted of documents written by Rusko Hristoforović (1395-1423) of the Serbian Chancellery in Dubrovnik. After 1860 when the political life in the Austro-Hungarian Monarchy was revived, he took part in the Serbian and Croatian national movements in Dalmatia and the politics in Croatia proper. Pucić as a leader of the conservative faction wedded the theory of the Croatian historical right to the Dalmatia to the convoluted ethno-linguistic arguments originating in early Slavonic studies circles (Kollar, Šafárik, Dobrovsky,..) which considered all native Shtokavian speakers as Serbs; later that century the theories about linguistic demarcation of Serbs and Croats, and hence the ethno-historical "ownership" of Dubrovnik and Kotor, had been subsumed in the ideology of Serbo-Croatism, a sort of cover term which considered Croats and Serbs as tribes of a single South Slavic nation. Medo Pucić was a vocal supporter of the unification of all the South-Slavic lands within the Habsburg monarchy around one nation, called later Yugoslavia.

Pucić's pan-Slavic (or pan-South-Slavic) idea  was based on the principle of unification of Croats with the Slavic tradition in Dubrovnik.

Medo Pucić was the first person to publicly call himself a Serb, while at the same time believing that the Croatian name for the language he spoke was merely a synonym of the Serbian name, so he was effectively an adherent of slovinstvo, a pan-Slavic view of South Slavic nationalities.

In 1868, he moved to Belgrade to become a teacher to the young prince Milan Obrenović IV until he came of age in 1872. He returned to Dubrovnik in 1874, and played an important role in the cultural life of the city in the 1870s. The Serb party had among its supporters in Dubrovnik, alongside Serbs (Orthodox), and some Catholics, who have since declared themselves Serbs of the Catholic faith, the Serb-Catholic movement in Dubrovnik. The appearance of Dubrovnik Serb Catholics was based on Vuk Karadžić's assumption that all those who spoke Štokavian were Serbs. The first one in Dubrovnik to adopt and exhibit Vuk's idea was poet Medo Pucić, followed by professors of the Dubrovnik Gymnasium, linguists Pero Budmani, Stjepo Castrapelli and Luko Zore. In 1874 when the literary magazine Slovinac, founded by Jovan Sundečić and Vuk Vrčević, needed an editor it Medo Pucić, then president of the Serb-Catholic Circle, who chose Luko Zore for the post. Around the publication gathered were Serb and Croat intellectuals for the next seven years of its existence.

Literary works
Pucić wrote lyrical and epic poems, patriotic lyric poetry, political essays and historical studies. The preferred motive of his work was the history of Dubrovnik and the Republic of Ragusa. He also translated literary works from several European languages into his own Dubrovnik dialect of Serbo-Croatian, which he called Serbian. He translated various Croatian and Serbian works into Italian, which is when he used the name Orsatto Pozza.

Pucić started writing poetry in 1840. He was initially writing romantic lyrics, but later moved towards a more national epic style. Some of his more important works include:
 Slovjanska antologija iz rukopisah dubrovačkih pjesnikah (Slavic Anthology from the Manuscripts of Dubrovnik Poets), 1844
 Talijanke (Italian Women), 1849 (elegies)
 Spomenici srpski od godine 1395. do 1423. (Serbian monuments from Year 1395 to 1423), book I, Belgrade 1858 and book II, Belgrade 1862
 Dei canti popolari illirici, discorso detto Adam Mickiewicz, Zara 1860
 Giovanni Gundulich. vita (Ivan Gundulić), from Favilla journal, Trieste, 1843, №XIX, p. 293-301
 Pjesme (Poems), 186 and 1879
 Karađurđevka, 1864
 Kasnachich G. (Giovanni) Augusto e O.P (Orsato Pozza) sugli slavi from giornale Dalmazia 1847 n. p. 43
 Le nozze di Platone, o dialogo dell amore, tradotto nell´occasione delle nozze di sua sorella Anna (con Marino Giorgi) dal Conte Orsato Pozza, Trieste 1857
 Compendio della storia di Ragusa dall´originale italiano di G. Resti per cura di O. Pozza, Zara 1856

See also

House of Pucić
Niko Pucić

References

External links 
 Đorđe Živanović: Mickiewicz in Serbo-Croatian literature, from Projekat Rastko
 Constantin Wurzbach: 23 Biographisches Lexikon des Kaisertums Österreich Dreiundzwanzigster Teil Podlaha - Prokesch (1872) 

1821 births
1882 deaths
People from Dubrovnik
People from the Kingdom of Dalmatia
Book and manuscript collectors
Knights of the Order of St John
Serbian writers
Serbian politicians
Serb-Catholic movement in Dubrovnik
University of Padua alumni